Abdallah Ragab is a defensive (left) midfielder for Egyptian Premier League team Telephonat Bani Sweif.
Ragab enjoyed a successful spell at Masry before joining ENPPI.

As of April 2010 he has earned four caps but is not included in the current squad selection line-up.

References

External links
 

Living people
1977 births
Footballers from Cairo
Egyptian footballers
Al Masry SC players
Association football midfielders